Robic or Robić is the surname of the following people:
Antony Robic (born 1986), French football midfielder
Geneviève Robic-Brunet (born 1959), Canadian road racing cyclist 
Ivo Robić (1923–2000), Croatian singer and songwriter
Jean Robic (1921–1980), French road racing cyclist
John Robic (born 1963), American basketball coach 
Jure Robič (1965–2010), Slovenian cyclist and soldier 
Mylène Dinh-Robic (born 1979), Canadian actress
Sašo Robič (1967–2010), Slovenian alpine skier
Xavier Robic (born 1979), French actor